Kari Yli-Renko (born November 17, 1959) is a former offensive lineman who played for four Canadian Football League teams from 1985 to 1993. Previously, he played three years in the United States Football League. He played college football for the Cincinnati Bearcats and was selected by the Cincinnati Bengals of the National Football League in the 1982 NFL Draft.

References

Career Stats

1959 births
Living people
Chicago Blitz players
New Jersey Generals players
Philadelphia/Baltimore Stars players
Hamilton Tiger-Cats players
Calgary Stampeders players
Ottawa Rough Riders players
Toronto Argonauts players
Canadian football offensive linemen
Cincinnati Bearcats football players
Players of Canadian football from Ontario
Sportspeople from Greater Sudbury
Canadian players of American football